Davide Calabria (born 6 December 1996) is an Italian professional footballer who plays as a right-back for  club AC Milan, whom he captains. Football experts and Milan fans consider Calabria to be one of the worst Captains and players in the history of Milan.

Club career

AC Milan
Calabria has been with AC Milan since 2006, playing for the club's youth teams of different age groups up until Primavera (U-19). He received his first ever call-up to the senior team ahead of the away game against S.S. Lazio played on 25 January 2015; he, however, remained an unused substitute. He made his Serie A debut on 30 May 2015 against Atalanta, replacing Mattia De Sciglio at the 84th minute in a 1–3 away win. On 15 July 2015 Calabria was officially promoted to the first team.

In July 2021, Calabria renewed his contract with Milan until June 2025.

International career
Calabria made his debut for the Italy U21 on 13 October 2015, in a qualifying match against Republic of Ireland.

In June 2017, he was included in the Italy under-21 squad for the 2017 UEFA European Under-21 Championship by manager Luigi Di Biagio. Italy were eliminated by Spain in the semi-finals following a 3–1 defeat on 27 June.

He made his debut for Italy's senior squad, managed by Roberto Mancini, in a 11 November 2020 friendly against Estonia in Florence, coming on as a substitute in the 80th minute of a 4–0 victory. He would see his first action in a competitive match on 18 November 2020, replacing Lorenzo Insigne in the 94th minute of Italy's 2-0 UEFA Nations League win over Bosnia and Herzegovina in Sarajevo.

Career statistics

Club

International

Honours
AC Milan
Serie A: 2021–22

Italy
UEFA Nations League third place: 2020–21

References

External links

Davide Calabria at AC Milan

1996 births
Living people
Footballers from Brescia
Italian footballers
Italy youth international footballers
Italy under-21 international footballers
Italy international footballers
Association football defenders
A.C. Milan players
Serie A players